The team dressage at the 1968 Summer Olympics took place on 24 October, at the Campo Marte. The event was open to men and women. The team dressage competition used the results of the first round of the individual dressage competition. The combined score of the three team members in that round was the team score.

Results

8 teams, or 24 riders, competed.

References

Equestrian at the 1968 Summer Olympics